Claes Edvin Johansson (4 November 1884 – 9 March 1949) was a Swedish wrestler who competed in the 1912, 1920 and 1924 Summer Olympics and won two gold medals, in 1912 and 1920. In 1913 he won the unofficial European Championships in the 75 kg division.

References

External links

profile

1884 births
1949 deaths
Olympic wrestlers of Sweden
Wrestlers at the 1912 Summer Olympics
Wrestlers at the 1920 Summer Olympics
Wrestlers at the 1924 Summer Olympics
Swedish male sport wrestlers
Olympic gold medalists for Sweden
Olympic medalists in wrestling
Medalists at the 1912 Summer Olympics
Medalists at the 1920 Summer Olympics